Town Tamer is a 1965 American Western film directed by Lesley Selander, written by Frank Gruber, and starring Dana Andrews, Terry Moore, Pat O'Brien, Lon Chaney Jr., Bruce Cabot, Lyle Bettger and Richard Arlen. It was released on July 7, 1965, by Paramount Pictures.

Plot
Saloon owner Riley Condor pays Lee Ring $2000 to kill aged gunman-for-hire Tom Rosser. In attempting to shoot Rosser in the back at night, Ring misses and kills Rosser's wife instead. Rosser goes to Great Plains, supposedly to look over property, but his agenda is to kill Condor. Word gets around that Rosser is in town and Condor realizes that his gunslinging henchmen, Horsinger, Tavenner, Slim Akins, Flon and Ring, are no match for Rosser, and he sets in motion a plan that will use the law to eliminate Rosser.

Cast 
Dana Andrews as Tom Rosser
Terry Moore as Susan Tavenner
Pat O'Brien as Judge Murcott
Lon Chaney Jr. as Mayor Charlie Leach 
Bruce Cabot as Riley Condor
Lyle Bettger as Lee Ring / Marshal Les Parker
Richard Arlen as Doctor Kent
Barton MacLane as James Fenimore Fell
Richard Jaeckel as Deputy Johnny Honsinger
Philip Carey as Jim Akins
Sonny Tufts as Carmichael
Coleen Gray as Carol Rosser
DeForest Kelley as Guy Tavenner
Jeanne Cagney as Mary Donley
Don "Red" Barry as 'Tex' 
James Brown as Davis
Richard Webb as Kevin
Roger Torrey as Mike Flon
Robert Ivers as Cowboy
Bob Steele as Ken
Dale Van Sickel as Bartender
Dinny Powell as Cook
Frank Gruber as Hotel Clerk

See also
List of American films of 1965

References

External links 
 

1965 films
1960s English-language films
Paramount Pictures films
American Western (genre) films
1965 Western (genre) films
Films directed by Lesley Selander
Films scored by Jimmie Haskell
1960s American films